The Beloved Rogue is a 1927 American silent romantic adventure film, loosely based on the life of the 15th century French poet, François Villon.  The film was directed by Alan Crosland for United Artists.

François Villon is played by John Barrymore, and other cast members include Conrad Veidt as King Louis XI and Marceline Day as Charlotte de Vauxcelles.

The story had been filmed in 1920 as If I Were King with William Farnum. The film was later re-made in the sound era again reverting to its original title If I Were King (1938) with Ronald Colman. And as an operetta, The Vagabond King (1930), and again in 1956.

Plot
François Villon is a poet and avid patriot whose father was burned at the stake. François is particularly committed to helping the oppressed and the weak. The Duke of Burgundy is out for the French throne. With cunning and deceit he tries to deceive the superstitious king, who is warned by his astrologers about a war with Burgundy. So the king also gives in to the demand that his ward Charlotte marry the Burgundian Count Thibault d'Aussigny.

On "All Fools' Day" François is elected King of Fools by the population. During the festivities, the Duke of Burgundy encounters the rabble and wants to end the celebration. François Villon recognizes the Duke and demands that the crowd remove him from his horse. The melee is interrupted by the arrival of King Louis and his entourage. The King, fearing an affront to the duke, banishes François from Paris. Soon thereafter, while Villon endures his banishment at a hostel outside of Paris, a wagon filled with food, which the Duke has sent to the King, stops outside of the hostel. Villon's desire to ridicule the King gets the better of him, and with his two loyal friends, Little Jehan and Nicholas, they steal the wagon in order to send the food to the people instead of the king. Climbing the treacherous walls of the city, they use the King's catapult to shuttle the food into town to care for the poor.

François is accidentally catapulted into the city. He ends up literally flying head first into the room of Charlotte de Vauxcelles. She and Count Thibault d'Aussigny have been forced to take refuge at an inn during a snow storm when Charlotte's sleigh breaks down. Entering the room to interrupt Charlotte's and Villon's encounter, the count pursues the surprised poet. A comical battle ensues in which François defeats Thibault. Charlotte decides to run away with the poet. But François is captured and Charlotte surrenders to her fate.

François is brought to Burgundy, tortured and, as a special wedding surprise, locked in a cage. Surprisingly, soldiers attack the king who has been convinced that the wedding is part of an intrigue against him. The soldiers free François and Charlotte, who now want to get married.

Cast
 John Barrymore—François Villon
 Conrad Veidt—King Louis XI
 Hans Conried as King Louis XI's son
 Marceline Day—Charlotte de Vauxcelles
 W. Lawson Butt—Duke of Burgundy
 Henry Victor—Thibault d'Aussigny
 Slim Summerville—Jehan
 Mack Swain—Nicholas
 Angelo Rossitto—Beppo the Dwarf
 Nigel De Brulier—Astrologer
 Lucy Beaumont—Villon's mother
 Otto Matieson—Olivier (as Otto Mattiesen)
 Jane Winton—The Abbess
 Rose Dione—Margot
 Bertram Grassby—Duke of Orleans
 Dick Sutherland—Tristan l'Hermite
 Martha Franklin—Maid (uncredited)
 Stubby Kruger -- (uncredited)
 Dickie Moore—Baby Francois (uncredited)

Cast member Dick Sutherland, like Rondo Hatton a couple of decades later, suffered from acromegaly.

Production and preservation status
According to "Hazard of the Game", an episode of the Thames documentary Hollywood, Paul Malvern, John Barrymore's stunt double, insisted on extensively testing a stunt involving a catapult and a net with sandbags before performing it, because he had doubts about the initial mathematics used for coordinating the stunt.

The only surviving domestic print of "The Beloved Rogue" was found in John Barrymore's former mansion by its subsequent occupant, Edgar Bergen, who donated it to the American Film Institute. It was subsequently preserved by the Library of Congress.

Reception
John Barrymore viewed the premiere of the film with a large picture palace audience. Unknown to the audience, he was standing at the back of the movie house. Barrymore apparently was discontented or bemused or perhaps being self-effacingly charming regarding his own performance stating "what a ham".

References

External links

 
 
 
 
 
 The Beloved Rogue at Kino Video
 The Beloved Rogue at Silents Are Golden
 Lithograph poster of The Beloved Rogue(Wayback version)

1927 films
1920s historical adventure films
American silent feature films
American historical adventure films
American black-and-white films
American swashbuckler films
Films set in the 15th century
Films directed by Alan Crosland
Films about François Villon
Cultural depictions of Louis XI of France
Cultural depictions of François Villon
Cultural depictions of Charles the Bold
United Artists films
1920s rediscovered films
Rediscovered American films
1920s American films
Silent historical adventure films
1920s English-language films